The 1984 International Games for the Disabled, canonically the 1984 Summer Paralympics were the seventh Paralympic Games to be held. There were two separate competitions: one in Stoke Mandeville, England, United Kingdom for wheelchair athletes with spinal cord injuries and the other at the Mitchel Athletic Complex and Hofstra University on Long Island, New York, United States for wheelchair and ambulatory athletes with cerebral palsy, amputees, and les autres [the others] (conditions as well as blind and visually impaired athletes). Stoke Mandeville had been the location of the Stoke Mandeville Games from 1948 onwards, seen as the precursors to the Paralympic Games, as the 9th International Stoke Mandeville Games in Rome in 1960 are now recognised as the first Summer Paralympics.
As with the 1984 Summer Olympics, the Soviet Union and other communist countries except China, East Germany, Hungary, Poland and Yugoslavia boycotted the Paralympic Games. The Soviet Union did not participate in the Paralympics at the time, arguing that they have no disabled people (called "invalids" by Soviet officials) in the country. The USSR made its Paralympic debut in 1988, during Perestroika.

The 1984 Paralympic Games were the last Summer Games not to be staged by the same host city as the Olympic Games. Seoul hosted both events in 1988, a pattern maintained thereafter.

Ceremonies 
In the opening ceremonies, patchy showers greeted the 14000 spectators packed into the Mitchel Park stadium for the 2pm start of the New York Games opening ceremony on 19 June. New York radio personality William B. Williams introduced everyone with a welcome speech. Entertainers such as Bill Buzzeo and the Dixie Ramblers, Richie Havens, The New Image Drum and Bugle Corps, the ARC Gospel Chorus and the Square Dance Extravaganza followed the introduction speech. At the closing ceremonies, Commander Archie Cameron, President of ICC officially closed the games with a short speech acknowledging the athletes and the next host city, Seoul, South Korea and was to be held in a conjunction with the 1988 Summer Olympics. The flag of the Games was lowered and American athletes carried the flag back to the honor stand where they handed over to the President of the Organizing Committee, Dr William T. Callahan and Cameron.

Mascot 

The mascot for the 1984 Paralympic Games was Dan D. Lion, which was designed by an art teacher Maryanne McGrath Higgins.

Sports 
Competitors were divided into five disability-specific categories: amputee, cerebral palsy, visually impaired, wheelchair, and les autres (athletes with physical disabilities that had not been eligible to compete in previous Games). The wheelchair category was for those competitors who used a wheelchair due to a spinal cord disability. However some athletes in the amputee and cerebral palsy categories also competed in wheelchairs. Within the sport of athletics, a wheelchair marathon event was held for the first time. The trials for the two wheelchair events to be held at the 1984 Los Angeles Olympic Games was held in conjunction with the New York Games. However, despite the long and established history of using "paralympic" terminology, in the United States the US Olympic Committee prohibited the Games organizers from using the term. The seventeen contested sports are listed below, along with the disability categories which competed in each.

 Archery – Cerebral palsy, wheelchair, and les autres
 Athletics – All
 Boccia – Cerebral palsy
 Cycling – Cerebral palsy
 Equestrian – Cerebral palsy
 Football 7-a-side – Cerebral palsy
 Goalball – Visually impaired
 Lawn bowls – Amputee and wheelchair
 Lifting – Amputee, cerebral palsy, wheelchair, and les autres
 Powerlifting
 Weightlifting
 Shooting – Amputee, cerebral palsy, wheelchair, and les autres
 Snooker – Wheelchair
 Swimming – All
 Table tennis – Amputee, cerebral palsy, wheelchair, and les autres
 Volleyball – Amputee and les autres
 Wheelchair basketball – Wheelchair and les autres
 Wheelchair fencing – Wheelchair
 Wrestling – Visually impaired

Medal table 

The host nations, Great Britain and the United States, are highlighted. Bahrain,  China, Jordan, Trinidad and Tobago won their first ever medals, with  Luxembourg winning a first ever gold.

Participating delegations 
Fifty-four delegations took part in the 1984 Paralympics. Bahrain, China, East Germany, Faroe Islands, Jordan, Liechtenstein, Papua New Guinea, Thailand, Trinidad and Tobago and Venezuela made their first appearances, India and Portugal returned to the Games after a 12-year absence.

Reception at the host cities
Odeda Rosenthal, a professor of humanities at a local community college on Long Island and translator for the Austrian team highlighted a number of problems at the games in a series of articles. She highlighted a number of issues such as poor communication, administrative hiccups and even bus drivers not knowing the routes to scheduled events that even caused some teams to miss events completely. Rosenthal continues by slamming the work by the Police Chief claiming the Chief "took the opposite tack of anything that was suggested to sort out the mess". However, overall reports and the general impression given off by the games was a friendly atmosphere and volunteers trying their hardest under difficult conditions.

See also 

1984 Summer Olympics
1984 Winter Olympics
1984 Winter Paralympics

References

External links
International Paralympic Committee

 
Paralympics Summer
Summer Paralympics
Summer Paralympics, 1984
Paralympics
Summer Paralympics
Stoke Mandeville
Sport in Buckinghamshire
Multi-sport events in the United States
Multi-sport events in the United Kingdom
Sports in Long Island
Paralympic Games
Summer Paralympic Games
20th century in Buckinghamshire
Summer Paralympics
Summer Paralympics
Summer Paralympics
Summer Paralympics